Nhill may refer to:

 Nhill, Victoria, a town
 Nhill railway station
 Nhill Airport
 Nhill (crater), Mars